Hurst Cottage is a grade II listed building on Hadley Common road, in Monken Hadley, north of Chipping Barnet. The building was completed in the late 17th or early 18th century and faces Monken Hadley Common. It was first listed in 1949, originally under the name Coach House Cottage.

References

External links 

Grade II listed buildings in the London Borough of Barnet
Houses in the London Borough of Barnet
Monken Hadley